Dante is a fictional character from the comic book series The Walking Dead and the television series of the same name, where he is portrayed by Juan Javier Cardenas.

Comic book series
Dante is a guard in the Hilltop Colony who appears to have a crush on Maggie and is one of her right-hand men. He looked for missing survivor Ken, but was captured, and later released alongside Ken by Alpha and The Whisperers. He later helps the others with the conflicts that comes ahead. Maggie sends him to spy on Negan after he leaves Alexandria.

Television series

Season 10
In the season premiere "Lines We Cross", Dante works with Siddiq in the infirmary and checks on Siddiq while he suffers from hallucinations and PTSD. Dante helps at the crash site to help put out the fire and attends to injured survivors. In the episode "Ghosts", Dante tells Siddiq that he was a field medic during combat in Iraq and suffered from PTSD after losing his entire military squad. In the episode "Silence the Whisperers", Dante treats an injured Lydia in the infirmary and Daryl arrives to check on her. In the episode "What It Always Is", Dante radios Siddiq to update him on Alexandria while he is at the Hilltop. In the episode "Bonds", at Alexandria, Siddiq and Dante rush to fight off a fast-moving infection within Alexandria, the cause of which they struggle to identify. In the episode "Open Your Eyes", Dante discovers that the medical kit being used to treat a prisoner's wounds contained hemlock, which was mistakenly given to him; Siddiq blames himself, as he realizes that he accidentally added the hemlock to the bag due to his fatigue. After seeing Dante burying one of the older infected women that he had grown close to, Siddiq attempts to commit suicide by drowning himself, but is rescued by Rosita. As they talk, Siddiq has a realization and rushes to test the water supply, discovering it to be contaminated; he blames himself for failing to notice. After decontaminating the water supply, Dante tries to cheer up a depressed Siddiq, reassuring him that what happened wasn't his fault. While doing so, Dante then makes a strange verbal tic which causes Siddiq to have another lucid dream, in which he remembers one of the Whisperers' making the same tic during the decapitation of several fair attendees. He realizes that Dante is a Whisperer agent who helped Alpha sneak into the Kingdom's fair and capture the victims. He moves to attack Dante, but Dante gets the upper hand and is able to subdue and choke him to death. In the first part finale "The World Before", it is shown that in  flashback several months after the blizzard, Alpha chooses and assigns Dante, due to his loyalty and because Lydia doesn't know him, to infiltrate Alexandria as her spy and sabotage the community from the inside for the impending war between them. It is revealed that Dante is the one who painted the "Silence the Whispers" graffiti, sabotaged the water supply, and suffocated Cheryl to death. In the present, Rosita goes to visit Siddiq, but finds Dante who attacks her. Rosita is able to stab Dante in the shoulder with a knife and is forced to put down a reanimated Siddiq, before beating Dante unconscious. Daryl, Carol, Gabriel, and Rosita interrogate Dante. That evening in Alexandria, Gabriel visits an imprisoned Dante and ends up stabbing him to death.

Development and reception
Juan Javier Cardenas was cast as Dante, Siddiq's wise-cracking medical assistant and a spy for the Whisperers. Angela Kang explains the decision to use Dante as a spy: "We just talked about the fact that a lot of times sociopaths can be very high functioning individuals that hide in plain sight because they're accomplished. And so, we were like, 'Well, people just tend to trust doctors. They just do. And it's something they need, and it connects to Siddiq.' And we were wanting to introduce Dante as a character, and we just decided to meld them together and see if we could play a story where like, 'Here's this person who, on the one hand, is incredibly charming and could be a friend and he legitimately actually likes Siddiq, but he's also got a deeper agenda.' So, that's how the genesis of the melding of Dante and this spy character came about."

Josh Wigler of The Hollywood Reporter commented in his review of the episode "Open Your Eyes", on bringing Dante to the show: "As far as Dante goes, the changes are much more radical. In the comic books, Dante is not a member of the Whisperers community. What's more, he ends up romantically linked to Maggie Rhee, played in the television series by Lauren Cohan, set to return at some point in season 10 and as a regular in season 11. Given what we now know about Dante on the show, it doesn’t feel like fireworks are in his future with the Hilltop's leader."

In a review of the first part finale "The World Before", Erik Kain of Forbes wrote: "Gabriel vs Dante and Rosita vs Dante scenes were both spectacular, but the whole "find the herd" plot and everything Whisperer related-including the weirdly anticlimactic cliffhanger-are just meh". Writing for TV Fanatic, Paul Dailly said in his review, "Dante's betrayal rocked the communities to the core. Everyone feels like there's no plausible way to trust people who want to join them, and that's going to cause problems. [...] Dante was a charismatic man who managed to fool everyone behind the walls of Alexandria. His loyalty to Alpha knew no bounds, even though his infiltration of the settlement was an initiation test to join the Whisperers."

References

The Walking Dead (franchise) characters